Kawasaki GPZ or GPz refers to a series of motorcycles produced by Kawasaki Heavy Industries Motorcycle & Engine.

Motorcycles in this series include:
 Kawasaki GPZ1100 (1981–1985)
 Kawasaki GPZ1100 B1/B2 (1981–1982)
 Kawasaki GPZ1100 Sport Touring/Horizont/ABS (1995–1998)
 Kawasaki GPZ1000RX (1986–1988)
 Kawasaki GPZ900R (1983–1996)
 Kawasaki GPZ750R (1985–1987)
 Kawasaki GPZ750 Turbo (1983–1985)
 Kawasaki GPZ750 (1982–1985)
 Kawasaki GPZ600R (1985–1997)
 Kawasaki GPZ550 (1981–1985)
 Kawasaki GPZ500S (1987–2009)
 Kawasaki GPZ400R (1985-1990)
 Kawasaki GPZ305 (1983–1994)
 Kawasaki GPZ250 (1983–1987)

See also
 Kawasaki GTR1000 "Concours" (1986–2006, same Motor as the GPZ1000RX)
 Kawasaki Eliminator "ZL900" & "ZL1000" (1985–1988, same Motor as the Kawasaki GPZ900R/GPZ1000RX)
 Kawasaki Z series (naked predecessor series)
 Kawasaki Ninja series
 List of Kawasaki motorcycles
 Kawasaki motorcycles